Mason Neck is a peninsula jutting into the Potomac River to the south of Washington, D.C., in the U.S. state of Virginia. It is surrounded by Belmont Bay to the west, the Potomac River to the south and east, Gunston Cove to the northeast, and Pohick Bay to the north-northeast. The population of the Mason Neck CDP was 2,005 as of the 2010 census.

History
The Mason Neck peninsula was inhabited by the Doeg prior to the arrival of European settlers. The recorded history of Mason Neck began around 1755 with the construction of Gunston Hall, the plantation house of George Mason, author of the Virginia Declaration of Rights. Mason Neck is also the location of Pohick Church, frequented by both Mason and George Washington, and Cranford Methodist Church, which was built in 1857 and served as a hospital during the Civil War.

During the 19th and early 20th centuries, much of the land was used for the logging of mature pine and hardwood timber. Over time, pollution and habitat destruction caused a decline in the bald eagle population. By the 1960s, much of the forest had grown back, but residential development as a suburb of Washington posed another threat. In 1969, local residents and conservation groups achieved the establishment of the Elizabeth Hartwell Mason Neck National Wildlife Refuge, with the specific objective of protecting the bald eagle. This, along with Mason Neck State Park and Pohick Bay Regional Park, provides a variety of recreational activities while preserving the land's natural resources.

This plot of land became the housing development known as Crosspointe. Many of the suburban subdivisions located around the Lorton Prison are built on land that the Lynch family once owned. The Mason Neck land that was traded to the county later became a state-controlled nature reserve called Meadowood.

Wildlife
In addition to bald eagles, Mason Neck is home to a variety of animal species. Birds include great blue herons, Canada geese, ospreys, wood ducks, teal, owls, and woodpeckers. Whitetail deer are common, along with beavers, muskrats, groundhogs, and foxes. A diverse population of frogs and toads can be heard on summer nights. Eastern box turtles, eastern snapping turtles, wood turtles, and spotted turtles can all be found around ponds, streams, and marshes, as well as snakes, such as the northern copperhead and the northern black racer.

References

External links 

 Mason Neck Citizens Association

Census-designated places in Fairfax County, Virginia
Washington metropolitan area
Virginia populated places on the Potomac River
Peninsulas of Virginia
Census-designated places in Virginia
Landforms of Fairfax County, Virginia